Kendall Daniel Milton (born February 10, 2002) is an American football running back for the Georgia Bulldogs.

Early years
Kendall grew up in Clovis, California and attended Buchanan High School. In his senior season he would total 1,514 yards rushing and made it to the endzone 23 times. 247Sports listed Milton as a 5 star recruit early on until his commitment to Georgia, at which time they changed him to 4 stars. Milton was also the number 1 running back and the 7th best player overall from California, and 54th best player in the country. Rivals had Milton as a 5 star recruit and the 29th player nationally. He selected Georgia of the likes of Alabama, Ohio State and Texas.

College career 
Upon Milton's arrival to Georgia, he was able to earn significant playing time, early in games, even as a true freshman. Even with tough competition he managed 193 yards on 35 attempts. Milton suffered an injury mid-season against rival Florida. He would return in the Peach Bowl. In addition, although he missed half of the season to injury, Milton was able to earn All American Freshman honors. The following season, Milton production increased as he ran for 264 yards and a touchdown with 56 carries.

References

External links
 Georgia Bulldogs bio

Living people
American football running backs
Players of American football from California
Georgia Bulldogs football players
Sportspeople from Fresno, California
Sportspeople from Clovis, California
2002 births